Arun Shankarrao Sarnaik (4 October 1935 – 21 June 1984) was an Indian actor and singer from Kolhapur, Maharashtra. He was the son of the famous singer "Maharashtrakokil" Pt. Shankarao Sarnaik and brother of famous classical singer "Pandit Nivruttibua Sarnaik" from Jaipur Atrauli Gharana (4 July 1912 – 16 February 1994).

Career 
Arun Sarnaik completed his graduation from Ruia College in Mumbai. After graduation, he did some work in the engineering factory at Ichalkaranji. He entered the acting profession in 1956 as a stage actor in the Marathi play Bhatala Dili Osri by Mo. Ga. Rangnekar. In 1961 he made his movie debut with Shahir Parshuram made by Anant Mane. Later, he acted in few films like "Vardakshina" by Dinkar D Patil and "Vithu maza lekurwala" by Datta Dharmadhikari. He subsequently had lead roles in many Marathi movies starting in the black-and-white film era, and color. His song "Pratham tuj pahta" in the Marathi film Mumbaicha Jawai became popular.

Sarnaik had a musical background from his father and uncle. Arun Sarnaik was also an accomplished Tabla and Harmonium player. He also was very active with the Anandagram Charitable institution. Bal Thackeray was a great fan of Sarnaik's tabla-playing skills. His role of Chief Minister in the movie Sinhasan (1979) which was directed by Jabbar Patel was a milestone for the Marathi film industry.

Social work 
He was closely associated with NGO Anandgram where he helped needy people.

Death 
Arun Sarnaik died in a road accident on 21 June 1984 along with his wife and one of his two children while he was going from Kolhapur to Pune. He was heading to Pune for first day of his shooting of the movie Pandharichi Vaari in which he was cast for the lead role. After his sudden death the movie was then completed by offering the lead role to other artist.

Playback singer movie list
Chandanachi Choli, Anga Anga Jaali (song: Ek Lajra na Sajra, Avghachi Ansar)
Dongarchi Mainaa
Gan Gaulan
Gharkul (song: Pappa saangaa kunache)
Manaacha Mujra

Playback songs
 एक लाजरा न्‌ साजरा Ek Lajara N Sajara 
 गणगौळण झाली सुरू Gan Gaulan Jhali Suru  
 तांडा चालला रे गड्या Tanda Chalala Re Gadya  
 पप्पा सांगा कुणाचे Pappa Sanga Kunache

Theater plays
Aparadh Meech Kela
Gosht Janmantarichi
Goodbye Doctor
Lavangi Mirchi Kolhapurachi
Tarun Turk, Mhatare Ark

Filmography

References

Indian male film actors
Male actors in Marathi cinema
Male actors in Marathi theatre
1935 births
1984 deaths
Road incident deaths in India
20th-century Indian male actors